Posht Kyubadam (also Romanized as Posht Kyūbādām) is a village in Kuhdasht-e Shomali Rural District, in the Central District of Kuhdasht County, Lorestan Province, Iran. At the 2006 census, its population was 86, in 20 families.

References 

Towns and villages in Kuhdasht County